Jordan Michael Oliver (born May 8, 1990) is an American freestyle, graduated folkstyle wrestler who competes at 65 kilograms and professional mixed martial artist who competes in the featherweight division of Bellator MMA. In freestyle, most notably he was the 2020 U.S. Olympic Team Member, but failed to qualify internationally after falling in the semifinals of the 2021 World Olympic Qualification Tournament. He was also the 2019 US national champion. As a folkstyle wrestler, Oliver was a two-time NCAA Division I national champion (three-time finalist) and four-time Big 12 Conference champion at Oklahoma State.

Folkstyle career

High school 
Oliver was born and raised in Easton, Pennsylvania and attended Easton Area High School. He holds the record for the most victories as a AAA district wrestler in the state's history, having a record of 175–5 in varsity. As a freshman, he won the district and regional tournaments and became the runner-up of the PIAA tournament with a record of 42–4. He had a perfect sophomore season, capping a perfect 48–0 record and winning every tournament mentioned before and being named Outstanding Wrestler at the state tournament. As a junior, he posted 45 victories and a lone loss, but also won every major tournament just like his senior year, where he posted an undefeated 40–0 record prior to graduation.

College 
Oliver was recruited by the Oklahoma State Cowboys. After redshirting '08-'09 and compiling a 19–1 record, Oliver posted an outstanding 32–4 record (15–2 in dual meets), won his first Big 12 Conference title while becoming the second Cowboy freshman to earn Outstanding Wrestler honors at the tournament and also became an All-American after a fourth-place finish at the 2010 NCAA's.

As a sophomore, he racked up 18 wins in 18 dual meets, where he hit 90 takedowns and 26 near falls. In the postseason, he became a two-time Big 12 Conference title holder and claimed his first NCAA Division I national title when he went 5–0 (two pins, one major, two decisions) at the 2011 NCAA tournament.

As a junior, he was the top-ranked wrestler at 133 pounds for the vast majority of the season. Sixty percent of his matches ended with a pin victory, a single-season school record, and 86.7 percent of his matches ended with bonus points for him, ranking second in school history behind John Smith's 1987 season. In the postseason, Oliver claimed his third straight Big 12 Conference title, and after earning three straight pins and a dominant 8–2 win to make the finals of the NCAA's, the defending champion was defeated by Ohio State's Logan Stieber (who would become the fourth four-time NCAA champion in history) in a closely contested match, to claim runner-up honors.

As a senior, Oliver put on 16 pounds and moved up two weight classes, but was still successful as he compiled 38 wins and no losses throughout the season. After becoming a four-time Big 12 Conference champion, Oliver competed as the top-seed at the NCAA's, where he compiled four dominant major decisions to make his third-straight final. He defeated Jason Chamberlain on points to become a two-time NCAA champion.

Freestyle career

Senior level

2009–2014 
A high school senior, Oliver made his senior freestyle debut on 2009, winning the US University National Championship. Instead of competing at the University World Championships, Oliver decided to compete at the Junior World Championships after also making the team. In 2012, Oliver competed at the US Olympic Team Trials, where he went 0–2, racking up experience against Brent Metcalf. Fresh out of college, Oliver reached the finals of the 2013 US Open, defeating Metcalf in the process. Next, he competed at United 4 Wrestling, defeating '12 Junior World Champion from Russia Magomed Kurbanaliev and two–time Olympian Haislan Garcia. At the US World Team Trials Challenge, he fell to Brent Metcalf. In 2014, he placed sixth at the US Open, defeated two–time Pac-12 Conference champion Borislav Novachkov at Beat the Streets, defeated Reece Humphrey at the US World Team Trials Challenge before being dropped by Metcalf to end as the runner–up and claimed a Bill Farrell bronze medal, notably defeating Georgi Ivanov.

2015–2018 
In 2015, he claimed Dave Schultz and Bill Farrell Memorial titles, a bronze medal from the Yasar Dogu, and became a two–time US National runner–up, as well as placing second at the US World Team Trials to Brent Metcalf. In 2016, he had two appearances, first losing to Aaron Pico at the US Olympic Team Trials and another one where he failed to make the US World Team at 70 kilograms to James Green. In 2017, he started off with another Dave Schultz Memorial title and went on to originally claim a US National title, but it was later overturned when he tested positive for amphetamines. Before his suspension, he was defeated by Frank Chamizo at Beat the Streets. In 2018, he came back after his suspension and defeated Olympic champion Toghrul Asgarov at Beat the Streets, and placed fifth at the Poland Open.

2019–2021 
In 2019, he placed second at the Dan Kolov Memorial and third at the U.S. World Team Trials, and claimed the Bill Farrell Memorial championship and the U.S. National title. Before the COVID-19 outbreak, he placed second at the prestigious 2020 Matteo Pellicone Ranking Series, defeating '14 University World Champion Selahattin Kılıçsallayan and reigning Junior World Champion Erik Arushanian before losing to reigning Asian Games champion Bajrang Punia. Oliver headlined the first major event during the COVID-19 pandemic in the United States, losing to reigning Pan American champion at 79 kilograms Jason Nolf. By the end of the year, he competed at the Flo 8-Man Challenge: 150 lbs, where he was upset in the first round by Alec Pantaleo.

In 2021, Oliver competed at the rescheduled U.S. Olympic Team Trials as the number four seed, in an attempt of representing the United States at the 2020 Summer Olympics. After defeating reigning NCAA champion Nick Lee, Oliver was able to upset reigning Pan American Champion Yianni Diakomihalis and advance to the finale. Next, he faced '18 US Open National champion Joey McKenna, whom he was able to shut down twice to non, becoming the 2020 US Olympic Team Member. As Zain Retherford had failed to qualify the weight for the United States at the 2020 Pan American Olympic Qualification Tournament, Oliver was forced to do so at the 2021 World Olympic Qualification Tournament a month after the US Olympic Trials. At the World Qualification Tournament, Oliver was able to reach the semifinals with wins over Yun Jun-sik, Hor Ohannesian and Ruhan Rasim, however, he was stopped by reigning Individual World Cup champion (70 kg) Magomedmurad Gadzhiev, failing to qualify for the 2020 Summer Olympics. As the U.S. Olympic Team Member, Oliver was scheduled to compete at the Pan American Continental Championships from on May 30, however, he was forced to not attend due to a torn LCL sustained at his last tournament, and will be replaced by the runner–up Joey McKenna.

Oliver bulked up to 70 kilograms and compete at the 2021 U.S. World Team Trials on September 11–12, intending to represent the country at the World Championships. After downing two-time Dan Hodge Trophy winner Zain Retherford, Oliver was downed himself by World silver medalist James Green, and subsequently forfeited out of the tournament.

2022 
Oliver opened up the year by competing at the Yasar Dogu International on February 27, but failed to place.

Mixed martial arts career

Bellator MMA 
On March 1, 2023, it was announced that Oliver had signed with Bellator MMA to start his MMA career.

Freestyle record 

! colspan="7"| Senior Freestyle Matches
|-
!  Res.
!  Record
!  Opponent
!  Score
!  Date
!  Event
!  Location
|-
! style=background:white colspan=7 |
|-
|Loss
|81–29
|align=left| Zain Retherford
|style="font-size:88%"|3–4
|style="font-size:88%" rowspan=3|June 3, 2022
|style="font-size:88%" rowspan=3|2022 Final X: Stillwater
|style="text-align:left;font-size:88%;" rowspan=3|
 Stillwater, Oklahoma
|-
|Win
|81–28
|align=left| Zain Retherford
|style="font-size:88%"|5–4
|-
|Loss
|80–28
|align=left| Zain Retherford
|style="font-size:88%"|3–8
|-
|Win
|80–27
|align=left| Ryan Deakin
|style="font-size:88%"|7–4
|style="font-size:88%" rowspan=2|May 21–22, 2022
|style="font-size:88%" rowspan=2|2022 US World Team Trials Challenge Tournament
|style="text-align:left;font-size:88%;" rowspan=2|
 Coralville, Iowa
|-
|Win
|79–27
|align=left| Michael Blockhus
|style="font-size:88%"|4–2
|-
! style=background:white colspan=7 |
|-
|Loss
|78–27
|align=left| Alec Pantaleo
|style="font-size:88%"|2–3
|style="font-size:88%" rowspan=5|April 27 – May 1, 2022
|style="font-size:88%" rowspan=5|2022 US Open National Championships
|style="text-align:left;font-size:88%;" rowspan=5|
 Las Vegas, Nevada
|-
|Win
|78–26
|align=left| Tyler Berger
|style="font-size:88%"|6–2
|-
|Win
|77–26
|align=left| Sammy Sasso
|style="font-size:88%"|7–1
|-
|Win
|76–26
|align=left| Devinaire Hayes
|style="font-size:88%"|TF 11–0
|-
|Win
|75–26
|align=left| Dean Noble
|style="font-size:88%"|Fall
|-
|Loss
|74–26
|align=left| Alec Pantaleo
|style="font-size:88%"|1–4
|style="font-size:88%"|March 16, 2022
|style="font-size:88%"|Rudis+: Snyder vs. Cox
|style="text-align:left;font-size:88%;"|
 Detroit, Michigan
|-
! style=background:white colspan=7 |
|-
|Loss
|74–25
|align=left| Aliakbar Fazlikhalili
|style="font-size:88%"|2–4
|style="font-size:88%"|February 27, 2022
|style="font-size:88%"|2022 Yasar Dogu International
|style="text-align:left;font-size:88%;"|
 Istanbul, Turkey
|-
! style=background:white colspan=7 |
|-
|
|
|align=left| Tyler Berger
|style="font-size:88%"|FF
|style="font-size:88%" rowspan=3|September 11, 2021
|style="font-size:88%" rowspan=3|2021 US World Team Trials
|style="text-align:left;font-size:88%;" rowspan=3| Lincoln, Nebraska
|-
|Loss
|74–24
|align=left| James Green
|style="font-size:88%"|4–6
|-
|Win
|74–23
|align=left| Zain Retherford
|style="font-size:88%"|2–2
|-
! style=background:white colspan=7 |
|-
|Loss
|73–23
|align=left| Magomedmurad Gadzhiev
|style="font-size:88%"|2–3
|style="font-size:88%" rowspan=4|May 6, 2021
|style="font-size:88%" rowspan=4|2021 World Olympic Qualification Tournament
|style="text-align:left;font-size:88%;" rowspan=4| Sofia, Bulgaria
|-
|Win
|73–22
|align=left| Hor Ohannesian
|style="font-size:88%"|3–3
|-
|Win
|72–22
|align=left| Yun Jun-sik
|style="font-size:88%"|5–4
|-
|Win
|71–22
|align=left| Ruhan Rasim
|style="font-size:88%"|6–2
|-
! style=background:white colspan=7 |
|-
|Win
|70–22
|align=left| Joey McKenna
|style="font-size:88%"|5–2
|style="font-size:88%" rowspan=4|April 2–3, 2021
|style="font-size:88%" rowspan=4|2020 US Olympic Team Trials
|style="text-align:left;font-size:88%;" rowspan=4| Forth Worth, Texas
|-
|Win
|69–22
|align=left| Joey McKenna
|style="font-size:88%"|3–0
|-
|Win
|68–22
|align=left| Yianni Diakomihalis
|style="font-size:88%"|4–4
|-
|Win
|67–22
|align=left| Nick Lee
|style="font-size:88%"|8–3
|-
! style=background:white colspan=7 |
|-
|Loss
|66–22
|align=left| Alec Pantaleo
|style="font-size:88%"|4–4
|style="font-size:88%" |December 18, 2020
|style="font-size:88%" |Flo 8-Man Challenge: 150 lbs
|style="text-align:left;font-size:88%;" |
 Austin, Texas
|-
|Loss
|66–21
|align=left| Jason Nolf
|style="font-size:88%"|1–4
|style="font-size:88%"|June 28, 2020
|style="font-size:88%"|2020 Rumble on the Rooftop
|style="text-align:left;font-size:88%;" |
 Chicago, Illinois
|-
! style=background:white colspan=7 |
|-
|Loss
|66–20
|align=left| Bajrang Punia
|style="font-size:88%"|3–4
|style="font-size:88%" rowspan=4|January 15, 2020
|style="font-size:88%" rowspan=4|2020 Matteo Pellicone Ranking Series 
|style="text-align:left;font-size:88%;" rowspan=4|
 Rome, Italy
|-
|Win
|66–19
|align=left| Erik Arushanian
|style="font-size:88%"|7–0
|-
|Win
|65–19
|align=left| Selahattin Kılıçsallayan
|style="font-size:88%"|4–0
|-
|Win
|64–19
|align=left| Syrbaz Talgat
|style="font-size:88%"|TF 10–0
|-
! style=background:white colspan=7 |
|-
|Win
|63–19
|align=left| Joey McKenna
|style="font-size:88%"|TF 10–0
|style="font-size:88%" rowspan=4|December 22, 2019
|style="font-size:88%" rowspan=4|2019 Senior Nationals - US Olympic Trials Qualifier
|style="text-align:left;font-size:88%;" rowspan=4|
 Fort Worth, Texas
|-
|Win
|62–19
|align=left| Nick Lee
|style="font-size:88%"|TF 10–0
|-
|Win
|61–19
|align=left| Bryce Meredith
|style="font-size:88%"|TF 10–0
|-
|Win
|60–19
|align=left| Nate Hansen
|style="font-size:88%"|TF 10–0
|-
! style=background:white colspan=7 |
|-
|Win
|59–19
|align=left| Frank Molinaro
|style="font-size:88%"|8–6
|style="font-size:88%" rowspan=4|November 16, 2019
|style="font-size:88%" rowspan=4|2019 Bill Farrell Memorial International
|style="text-align:left;font-size:88%;" rowspan=4|
 New York City, New York
|-
|Win
|58–19
|align=left| Joey McKenna
|style="font-size:88%"|5–3
|-
|Win
|57–19
|align=left| Bryce Meredith
|style="font-size:88%"|TF 11–0
|-
|Win
|56–19
|align=left| Nick Dardanes
|style="font-size:88%"|TF 10–0
|-
! style=background:white colspan=7 |
|-
|Loss
|55–19
|align=left| Zain Retherford
|style="font-size:88%"|6–7
|style="font-size:88%" rowspan=4|May 19, 2019
|style="font-size:88%" rowspan=4|2019 US World Team Trials Challenge Tournament
|style="text-align:left;font-size:88%;" rowspan=4|
 Raleigh, North Carolina
|-
|Loss
|55–18
|align=left| Zain Retherford
|style="font-size:88%"|6–7
|-
|Win
|55–17
|align=left| Dominick Demas
|style="font-size:88%"|6–2
|-
|Win
|54–17
|align=left| Kanen Storr
|style="font-size:88%"|6–2
|-
! style=background:white colspan=7 |
|-
|Loss
|53–17
|align=left| Yianni Diakomihalis
|style="font-size:88%"|TF 5–16
|style="font-size:88%" rowspan=4|April 26, 2019
|style="font-size:88%" rowspan=4|2019 US Open National Championships
|style="text-align:left;font-size:88%;" rowspan=4|
 Las Vegas, Nevada
|-
|Win
|53–16
|align=left| Evan Henderson
|style="font-size:88%"|8–0
|-
|Win
|52–16
|align=left| Taylor Summers
|style="font-size:88%"|TF 11–1
|-
|Win
|51–16
|align=left| Montell Marion
|style="font-size:88%"|7–1
|-
! style=background:white colspan=7 |
|-
|Loss
|50–16
|align=left| Bajrang Punia
|style="font-size:88%"|3–12
|style="font-size:88%" rowspan=5|March 1, 2019
|style="font-size:88%" rowspan=5|2019 RS - Dan Kolov - Nikola Petrov Tournament
|style="text-align:left;font-size:88%;" rowspan=5|
 Russe, Bulgaria
|-
|Win
|50–15
|align=left| Selahattin Kılıçsallayan
|style="font-size:88%"|9–1
|-
|Win
|49–15
|align=left| Evan Henderson
|style="font-size:88%"|TF 12–1
|-
|Win
|48–15
|align=left| Bernard Futrell
|style="font-size:88%"|TF 10–0
|-
|Win
|47–15
|align=left| Agustín Destribats
|style="font-size:88%"|3–3
|-
! style=background:white colspan=7 |
|-
|Loss
|46–15
|align=left| Akhmed Chakaev
|style="font-size:88%"|8–9
|style="font-size:88%" rowspan=3|September 8, 2018
|style="font-size:88%" rowspan=3|2018 Ziolkowski, Pytlasinski, Poland Open
|style="text-align:left;font-size:88%;" rowspan=3|
 Warsaw, Poland
|-
|Win
|46–14
|align=left| Masakazu Kamoi
|style="font-size:88%"|4–1
|-
|Win
|45–14
|align=left| Michael Asselstine
|style="font-size:88%"|TF 10–0
|-
|Win
|44–14
|align=left| Toghrul Asgarov
|style="font-size:88%"|4–4
|style="font-size:88%"|May 17, 2018
|style="font-size:88%"|2018 Beat The Streets: Team USA vs. The World All-Stars
|style="text-align:left;font-size:88%;" |
 New York City, New York
|-
|Loss
|43–14
|align=left| Frank Chamizo
|style="font-size:88%"|6–7
|style="font-size:88%"|May 17, 2017
|style="font-size:88%"|2017 Beat The Streets: Times Square
|style="text-align:left;font-size:88%;" |
 New York City, New York
|-
! style=background:white colspan=7 |
|-
|NC
|43–13
|align=left| Frank Molinaro
|style="font-size:88%"|NC (overturned)
|style="font-size:88%" rowspan=5|April 26, 2017
|style="font-size:88%" rowspan=5|2017 US Open National Championships
|style="text-align:left;font-size:88%;" rowspan=5|
 Las Vegas, Nevada
|-
|NC
|43–13
|align=left| Zain Retherford
|style="font-size:88%"|NC (overturned)
|-
|NC
|43–13
|align=left| Kellen Russell
|style="font-size:88%"|NC (overturned)
|-
|NC
|43–13
|align=left| Deondre Wilson
|style="font-size:88%"|NC (overturned)
|-
|NC
|43–13
|align=left| Jaydin Eierman
|style="font-size:88%"|NC (overturned)
|-
! style=background:white colspan=7 |
|-
|Win
|43–13
|align=left| Jason Chamberlain
|style="font-size:88%"|8–6
|style="font-size:88%" rowspan=3|February 2, 2017
|style="font-size:88%" rowspan=3|2017 Dave Schultz Memorial International
|style="text-align:left;font-size:88%;" rowspan=3|
 Colorado Springs, Colorado
|-
|Win
|42–13
|align=left| Nazar Kulchytskyy
|style="font-size:88%"|7–2
|-
|Win
|41–13
|align=left| Michael DePalma
|style="font-size:88%"|TF 11–0
|-
! style=background:white colspan=7 | 
|-
|Loss
|40–13
|align=left| Aaron Pico
|style="font-size:88%"|9–11
|style="font-size:88%"|April 9, 2016
|style="font-size:88%"|2016 US Olympic Team Trials
|style="text-align:left;font-size:88%;" |
 Iowa City, Iowa
|-
! style=background:white colspan=7 |
|-
|Win
|40–12
|align=left| Logan Stieber
|style="font-size:88%"|8–5
|style="font-size:88%" rowspan=4|November 7, 2015
|style="font-size:88%" rowspan=4|2015 Bill Farrell Memorial International
|style="text-align:left;font-size:88%;" rowspan=4|
 New York City, New York
|-
|Win
|39–12
|align=left| Frank Molinaro
|style="font-size:88%"|4–4
|-
|Win
|38–12
|align=left| Nazar Kulchytskyy
|style="font-size:88%"|5–2
|-
|Win
|37–12
|align=left| Rustam Ampar
|style="font-size:88%"|5–2
|-
! style=background:white colspan=7 |
|-
|Loss
|36–12
|align=left| Brent Metcalf
|style="font-size:88%"|0–7
|style="font-size:88%" rowspan=5|June 14, 2015
|style="font-size:88%" rowspan=2|2015 US World Team Trials
|style="text-align:left;font-size:88%;" rowspan=5|
 Madison, Wisconsin
|-
|Loss
|36–11
|align=left| Brent Metcalf
|style="font-size:88%"|4–9
|-
|Win
|36–10
|align=left| Logan Stieber
|style="font-size:88%"|8–5
|style="font-size:88%" rowspan=3|2015 US World Team Trials Challenge Tournament
|-
|Win
|35–10
|align=left| Jimmy Kennedy
|style="font-size:88%"|2–2
|-
|Win
|34–10
|align=left| Joey McKenna
|style="font-size:88%"|TF 10–0
|-
! style=background:white colspan=7 |
|-
|Loss
|33–10
|align=left| Brent Metcalf
|style="font-size:88%"|1–2
|style="font-size:88%" rowspan=4|May 8, 2015
|style="font-size:88%" rowspan=4|2015 Las Vegas/ASICS U.S. Nationals
|style="text-align:left;font-size:88%;" rowspan=4|
 Las Vegas, Nevada
|-
|Win
|33–9
|align=left| Kellen Russell
|style="font-size:88%"|4–3
|-
|Win
|32–9
|align=left| Jayson Ness
|style="font-size:88%"|5–0
|-
|Win
|31–9
|align=left| Cole VonOhlen
|style="font-size:88%"|TF 12–2
|-
! style=background:white colspan=7 |
|-
|Win
|30–9
|align=left| Bekzod Abdurakhmonov
|style="font-size:88%"|4–2
|style="font-size:88%" rowspan=4|January 29, 2015
|style="font-size:88%" rowspan=4|2015 Dave Schultz Memorial International
|style="text-align:left;font-size:88%;" rowspan=4|
 Istanbul, Turkey
|-
|Win
|29–9
|align=left| Emre Ayvaz
|style="font-size:88%"|TF 11–1
|-
|Win
|28–9
|align=left| Mehmet Oktay
|style="font-size:88%"|4–2
|-
|Loss
|27–9
|align=left| Evgheni Nedealco
|style="font-size:88%"|2–8
|-
! style=background:white colspan=7 |
|-
|Win
|27–8
|align=left| Reece Humphrey
|style="font-size:88%"|5–1
|style="font-size:88%" rowspan=4|January 29, 2015
|style="font-size:88%" rowspan=4|2015 Dave Schultz Memorial International
|style="text-align:left;font-size:88%;" rowspan=4|
 Colorado Springs, Colorado
|-
|Win
|26–8
|align=left| Jason Chamberlain
|style="font-size:88%"|3–0
|-
|Win
|25–8
|align=left| Zain Retherford
|style="font-size:88%"|6–2
|-
|Win
|24–8
|align=left| Brett Robbins
|style="font-size:88%"|TF 10–0
|-
! style=background:white colspan=7 |
|-
|Win
|23–8
|align=left| Cyler Sanderson
|style="font-size:88%"|4–0
|style="font-size:88%" rowspan=5|November 7, 2014
|style="font-size:88%" rowspan=5|2014 Bill Farrell Memorial International
|style="text-align:left;font-size:88%;" rowspan=5|
 New York City, New York
|-
|Win
|22–8
|align=left| Georgi Ivanov
|style="font-size:88%"|TF 14–4
|-
|Loss
|21–8
|align=left| Adam Hall
|style="font-size:88%"|2–4
|-
|Win
|21–7
|align=left| Cyler Sanderson
|style="font-size:88%"|10–4
|-
|Win
|20–7
|align=left| Igor Moroi
|style="font-size:88%"|3–2
|-
! style=background:white colspan=7 |
|-
|Loss
|19–7
|align=left| Brent Metcalf
|style="font-size:88%"|0–3
|style="font-size:88%" rowspan=5|June 1, 2014
|style="font-size:88%" rowspan=2|2014 US World Team Trials
|style="text-align:left;font-size:88%;" rowspan=5|
 Madison, Wisconsin
|-
|Loss
|19–6
|align=left| Brent Metcalf
|style="font-size:88%"|2–4
|-
|Win
|19–5
|align=left| Reece Humphrey
|style="font-size:88%"|4–3
|style="font-size:88%" rowspan=3|2014 US World Team Trials Challenge Tournament
|-
|Win
|18–5
|align=left| Kellen Russell
|style="font-size:88%"|3–1
|-
|Win
|17–5
|align=left| Nick Dardanes
|style="font-size:88%"|2–0
|-
|Win
|16–5
|align=left| Borislav Novachkov
|style="font-size:88%"|4–1
|style="font-size:88%"|May 7, 2014
|style="font-size:88%"|2014 Beat The Streets: Team USA vs. The World All-Stars
|style="text-align:left;font-size:88%;" |
 New York City, New York
|-
! style=background:white colspan=7 |
|-
|Loss
|15–5
|align=left| Kellen Russell
|style="font-size:88%"|2–4
|style="font-size:88%" rowspan=4|April 17–19, 2014
|style="font-size:88%" rowspan=4|2014 US Open National Championships
|style="text-align:left;font-size:88%;" rowspan=4|
 Las Vegas, Nevada
|-
|Win
|15–4
|align=left| Logan Stieber
|style="font-size:88%"|5–3
|-
|Win
|14–4
|align=left| Ryan Fillingame
|style="font-size:88%"|Fall
|-
|Win
|13–4
|align=left| Josh Howk
|style="font-size:88%"|TF 10–0
|-
! style=background:white colspan=7 |
|-
|Loss
|12–4
|align=left| Brent Metcalf
|style="font-size:88%"|3–6
|style="font-size:88%" rowspan=3|June 20–22, 2013
|style="font-size:88%" rowspan=3|2013 US World Team Trials Challenge Tournament
|style="text-align:left;font-size:88%;" rowspan=3|
 Stillwater, Oklahoma
|-
|Win
|12–3
|align=left| Chase Pami
|style="font-size:88%"|TF 8–0
|-
|Win
|11–3
|align=left| Jason Chamberlain
|style="font-size:88%"|TF 7–0
|-
|Win
|10–3
|align=left| Haislan Garcia
|style="font-size:88%"|5–2
|style="font-size:88%"rowspan=2|May 19, 2013
|style="font-size:88%"rowspan=2|2013 Beat The Streets: United 4 Wrestling
|style="text-align:left;font-size:88%;" rowspan=2|
 Los Angeles, California
|-
|Win
|9–3
|align=left| Magomed Kurbanaliev
|style="font-size:88%"|7–6
|-
! style=background:white colspan=7 |
|-
|Loss
|8–3
|align=left| Kellen Russell
|style="font-size:88%"|1–0, 2–2, 0–1
|style="font-size:88%" rowspan=4|April 17–20, 2013
|style="font-size:88%" rowspan=4|2013 US Open National Championships
|style="text-align:left;font-size:88%;" rowspan=4|
 Las Vegas, Nevada
|-
|Win
|8–2
|align=left| Brent Metcalf
|style="font-size:88%"|1–0, 0–1, 1–0
|-
|Win
|7–2
|align=left| Jason Chamberlain
|style="font-size:88%"|2–0, 5–2
|-
|Win
|6–2
|align=left| Dylan Alton
|style="font-size:88%"|0–1, 3–0, 2–0
|-
! style=background:white colspan=7 |
|-
|Loss
|5–2
|align=left| Adam Hall
|style="font-size:88%"|0–1, 1–1
|style="font-size:88%" rowspan=2|April 21, 2012
|style="font-size:88%" rowspan=2|2012 US Olympic Team Trials
|style="text-align:left;font-size:88%;" rowspan=2|
 Iowa City, Iowa
|-
|Loss
|5–1
|align=left| Brent Metcalf
|style="font-size:88%"|0–1, 1–0, 0–1
|-
! style=background:white colspan=7 |
|-
|Win
|5–0
|align=left| Andrew Long
|style="font-size:88%"|2–0, 4–0
|style="font-size:88%" rowspan=5|April 24–26, 2009
|style="font-size:88%" rowspan=5|2009 US University National Championships
|style="text-align:left;font-size:88%;" rowspan=5|
 Akron, Ohio
|-
|Win
|4–0
|align=left| Tyler Saltsman
|style="font-size:88%"|Fall
|-
|Win
|3–0
|align=left| Shane Valko
|style="font-size:88%"|TF 7–0, 9–1
|-
|Win
|2–0
|align=left| Michael DeMarco
|style="font-size:88%"|TF 6–0, 7–0
|-
|Win
|1–0
|align=left| Thane Antczak
|style="font-size:88%"|TF 6–0, 6–0
|-

NCAA record 

! colspan="8"| NCAA Championships Matches
|-
!  Res.
!  Record
!  Opponent
!  Score
!  Date
!  Event
|-
! style=background:white colspan=6 |2013 NCAA Championships  at 149 lbs
|-
|Win
|18–3
|align=left|Jason Chamberlain
|style="font-size:88%"|3–2
|style="font-size:88%" rowspan=5|March 21–23, 2013
|style="font-size:88%" rowspan=5|2013 NCAA Division I Wrestling Championships
|-
|Win
|17–3
|align=left| Steve Santos
|style="font-size:88%"|MD 14–3
|-
|Win
|16–3
|align=left|Jake Sueflohn
|style="font-size:88%"|MD 11–3
|-
|Win
|15–3
|align=left|Derek Valenti
|style="font-size:88%"|MD 13–3
|-
|Win
|14–3
|align=left|David Habat
|style="font-size:88%"|MD 16–6
|-
! style=background:white colspan=6 |2012 NCAA Championships  at 133 lbs
|-
|Loss
|13–3
|align=left|Logan Stieber
|style="font-size:88%"|3–4
|style="font-size:88%" rowspan=5|March 15–17, 2012
|style="font-size:88%" rowspan=5|2012 NCAA Division I Wrestling Championships
|-
|Win
|13–2
|align=left| Bernard Futrell
|style="font-size:88%"|8–2
|-
|Win
|12–2
|align=left|Zach Stevens
|style="font-size:88%"|Fall
|-
|Win
|11–2
|align=left|Shelton Mack
|style="font-size:88%"|Fall
|-
|Win
|10–2
|align=left|Frank Martellotti
|style="font-size:88%"|Fall
|-
! style=background:white colspan=6 |2011 NCAA Championships  at 133 lbs
|-
|Win
|9–2
|align=left|Andrew Hochstrasser
|style="font-size:88%"|8–4
|style="font-size:88%" rowspan=5|March 17–19, 2011
|style="font-size:88%" rowspan=5|2011 NCAA Division I Wrestling Championships
|-
|Win
|8–2
|align=left| Tyler Graff
|style="font-size:88%"|5–2
|-
|Win
|7–2
|align=left|Mike Grey
|style="font-size:88%"|MD 10–2
|-
|Win
|6–2
|align=left|Levi Mele
|style="font-size:88%"|Fall
|-
|Win
|5–2
|align=left|Tyler Small
|style="font-size:88%"|Fall
|-
! style=background:white colspan=6 |2010 NCAA Championships 4th at 133 lbs
|-
|Loss
|4–2
|align=left|Franklin Gómez
|style="font-size:88%"|MD 0–8
|style="font-size:88%" rowspan=6|March 18–20, 2010
|style="font-size:88%" rowspan=6|2010 NCAA Division I Wrestling Championships
|-
|Win
|4–1
|align=left|Dan Mitcheff
|style="font-size:88%"|4–3
|-
|Loss
|3–1
|align=left|Jayson Ness
|style="font-size:88%"|TB 0–1
|-
|Win
|3–0
|align=left|Borislav Novachkov
|style="font-size:88%"|TB 5–4
|-
|Win
|2–0
|align=left|Dave Marble
|style="font-size:88%"|6–4
|-
|Win
|1–0
|align=left|Zach Stevens
|style="font-size:88%"|3–2
|-

References

External links
"Jordan Oliver" biography at Team USA

1990 births
Living people
Amateur wrestlers
American male sport wrestlers
Easton Area High School alumni
Oklahoma State Cowboys wrestlers
Oklahoma State University alumni
Sportspeople from Easton, Pennsylvania